The Ferrari FF (Type F151) (FF meaning "Ferrari Four", for four seats and four-wheel drive) is a grand tourer presented by Italian automobile manufacturer Ferrari on March 1, 2011, at the Geneva Motor Show as a successor to the 612 Scaglietti grand tourer. It is Ferrari's first production four-wheel drive model. The body style has been described as a shooting brake, a type of two-door coupé-based sporting estate. Ferrari states that the FF was the world's fastest four-seat automobile upon its release to the public. The FF costs US$300,000,  with 800 being produced during the first year.

Specifications

Engine

Transmission
The FF is equipped with a 7-speed dual-clutch transmission and paddle shift system similar to the California, the 458 Italia, and the F12berlinetta.

Four wheel drive system

The new four-wheel drive system, engineered and patented by Ferrari, is called 4RM: it is around 50% lighter than a conventional system, and provides power intelligently to each of the four wheels as needed.  It functions only when the manettino dial on the steering wheel is in the "comfort" or "snow" positions, leaving the car most often in the traditional rear wheel drive layout.

Ferrari's first use of four-wheel drive was in a prototype developed in the end of the 1980s, called the 408 4RM (abbreviation of "4.0 litre, 8 cylinder, 4 Ruote Motrici", meaning "four-wheel drive").

This system is based around a second, simple, gearbox (gears and other components built by Carraro Engineering), taking power from the front of the engine. This gearbox (designated "power take off unit", or PTU) has only two forward gears (2nd and 4th) plus reverse (with gear ratios 6% taller than the corresponding ratios in the main gearbox), so the system is only active in 1st to 4th gears. The connection between this gearbox and each front wheel is via independent Haldex-type clutches, without a differential.
Due to the difference in ratios "the clutches continually slip" and only transmit, at most, 20% of the engine's torque.
A detailed description of the system (based on a conversation with Roberto Fedeli, Ferrari's technical director) has been published.

Design

Exterior

The FF shares the design language of contemporary Ferrari automobiles, including the pulled-back headlights of the 458 Italia, and the twin circular taillights seen on the 458 as well as the 599 GTB Fiorano. Designed under the direction of Lowie Vermeersch, former design director at Pininfarina, and Flavio Manzoni, Ferrari's Styling Centre, work on the shooting brake concept initially started following the creation of the Sintesi show car of 2007. Distinctive styling elements include a large "egg-crate" grille, defined side skirts, and four exhaust tips. The shooting brake configuration is a departure from the conventional wedge shape of modern Ferrari automobiles, and the FF has been likened to the similarly shaped 1962 Ferrari 250 GT SWB Drogo race car.

Interior
Luxury is the main element of the interior and the use of leather is incorporated throughout, just like the predecessors of the FF. Creature comforts like premium air conditioning, GPS navigation system, carpeting and sound system are also used.

Awards
Car and Driver China magazine gives the FF the title of “Most Beautiful Super Car 2011” at the Shanghai Auto Show.
Oriental TV nominated the FF “Most Popular Imported Car Model at 2011 Shanghai Auto Show”.
The FF won Top Gear magazine's "Estate Car of the Year 2011" award.
The FF won Top Gear Indian magazine's "Luxury Car of The Year 2012" award.
According to Friday, 31 May 2013 US Department of Energy, Ferrari FF, 12 cyl., 6.3 L, Auto (AM7) is 2013 Least Fuel Efficient Car in the midsize class (the same position as the Bentley Mulsanne 8 cyl., 6.8 L, Auto (S8), with

One-offs and specials

SP FFX 
The Ferrari SP FFX, introduced in 2014, is a one-off based on the FF. Its most notable feature is its custom body that features a more traditional coupé rear end in place of the FF's shooting brake tail. The car was commissioned by a customer in Japan and was built by Ferrari's special vehicles division to Pininfarina's design. Originally, when patent drawings surfaced online many sources thought the SP FFX was the design for the next generation Ferrari California.

References

External links

 Official Ferrari FF Website

All-wheel-drive vehicles
FF
Grand tourers
Cars introduced in 2011